The 2021–22 Serie A (women) was the 55th season of the women's football top-level league in Italy. It began on 28 August 2021.

Teams

Team changes

Stadiums and locations

Format
Teams play each other twice for a total of 22 games. Three teams get relegated, because the next season will see a change of format and only ten teams in the league. This is an effort to professionalize the league.

League table

Results

Season's statistics

Topscorers

Assists

References

External links

Official Website

2021–22 domestic women's association football leagues
2021-22
Women